Joseph Richard Skeen (June 30, 1927 – December 7, 2003) was an American politician who served as a congressman from southern New Mexico. A conservative Republican, he served for eleven terms in the United States House of Representatives between 1981 and 2003.

Early life and education
Skeen was born in Roswell, New Mexico. During his teenage years, his family moved to Seattle. During the final year of World War II, Skeen entered the United States Navy. After returning home, he graduated from Texas A&M University in College Station, Texas.

After several years of owning a ranch in Picacho, Skeen was elected to the New Mexico State Senate as a Republican in 1960. He unsuccessfully ran for lieutenant governor in 1970 on a ticket headed by future Senator Pete Domenici. Incumbent Republican Governor David F. Cargo was ineligible to run for the first four-year gubernatorial term in the history of the state. Cargo therefore ran unsuccessfully in the primary for the Senate seat retained by Democrat Joseph Montoya.

Thereafter, Skeen lost two very close races for governor – in 1974 against Democrat Jerry Apodaca and in 1978 against Democrat Bruce King. In the former race, Apodaca led 164,172 (50 percent) to Skeen's 160,430 (49 percent). In 1978, King secured a second nonconsecutive term, 174,631 (51 percent) to Skeen's 170,848 (49 percent).

1980 Congressional election 
Throughout the 1970s, five-term Democratic Congressman Harold Runnels had been so popular that the GOP didn't even put up a candidate against him in 1978 or 1980. Then, on August 5, 1980, Runnels died of cancer at the age of fifty-six. The state attorney general, a Democrat, announced that the Democrats could replace Runnels on the ballot but that it was too late for the Republicans to do so. Republicans were outraged and rallied behind a write-in effort by Skeen, while the Democrats selected Governor Bruce King's nephew, David King, over Runnels' widow, Dorothy Runnels. To complicate matters for the Democrats, Dorothy Runnels was so angry at how the Democrats treated her in the primary that she elected to run her own write-in campaign. Furthermore, David King had only moved his voter registration into the district some ten days after Runnels died.

Skeen was elected with 61,564 votes (38 percent) to King's 55,085 (34 percent), and Mrs. Runnels' 45,343 (28 percent). He was helped by the split among the Democrats, as well as Ronald Reagan carrying the district.  Skeen was only the third person in U.S. history to be elected to Congress as a write-in candidate.

As a congressman, Skeen had a largely conservative voting record but also brought numerous projects to his district. In contrast to most congressmen, Skeen faced several competitive races for reelection.  After skating to reelection from 1982 to 1990 – including two completely unopposed bids in 1988 and 1990 – he faced aggressive Democratic challenges for most of the 1990s.

He announced in 1997 that he had Parkinson's disease. Skeen announced his retirement from Congress in 2002 and left at the end of his 11th term in 2003. At the time of his death in 2003, he was highly regarded by New Mexicans in both parties for his service to his state.

On October 10, 2002, Skeen voted in favor of authorizing the invasion of Iraq.

In the 2002 Republican primary to choose a nominee to succeed Skeen, the party turned to Steve Pearce, who defeated Edward R. Tinsley, an attorney and businessman who owns the K-Bob's Steakhouse restaurant chain. Tinsley tried again in 2008, when Pearce vacated the seat for an unsuccessful U.S. Senate candidacy, but he was defeated in the general election by the Democratic nominee, Harry Teague of Hobbs.

References

External links

 

1927 births
2003 deaths
Republican Party New Mexico state senators
United States Navy sailors
Deaths from Parkinson's disease
Neurological disease deaths in New Mexico
Ranchers from New Mexico
Texas A&M University alumni
People from Roswell, New Mexico
Republican Party members of the United States House of Representatives from New Mexico
20th-century American politicians
21st-century American politicians